Boechera retrofracta is a species of flowering plant in family Brassicaceae. The common names include reflexed rockcress.

Description
Boechera retrofracta is a biennial or short-lived perennial species. The plants typically have single stems 1.5 to 7 dm (sometimes to 10.5 dm) tall. The basal leaves are densely pubescent, oblanceolate shaped, 2 to 7 mm wide, with entire margins or shallowly dentate. The flowers are arranged into a usually unbranched raceme with 15 to 80 flowers but sometimes having as many as 140. The flowers are pendent and the petals are white to lavender. The fruits (siliques) are strongly reflexed (pendulous or pendent), usually appressed to rachis at maturity. The seeds have narrowly winged margins. Flowering in April thru August. Chromosomes: 2n=14.

Habitat
Boechera retrofracta was listed as a threatened species in Minnesota in 1984 because of its rarity and the small size of its populations. In Minnesota populations are found in the Boundary Water Canoe Area in crevices on dry, north-and east-facing diabase cliffs,  in association with other rare plants like: Woodsia scopulina (Rocky Mountain woodsia) and Asplenium trichomanes ssp. trichomanes (maidenhair spleenwort).  There are also populations is Kittson county in dry prairie and sand dune habitat in association with xerophytes such as Juniperus horizontalis (creeping juniper), Orthocarpus luteus (owl clover), and Houstonia longifolia (bluets). It has also been found in bur oak savanna. In California it is found growing on rock outcrops, in sandy soil, in grasslands and sagebrush steppes, and in open conifer forests.

Distribution
Boechera retrofracta occurs in California, Alaska, western Canada, Colorado, Minnesota.

References

retrofracta